The Zion – Mount Carmel Highway is a  long road in Washington and Kane counties in southern Utah, United States, that is listed on the National Register of Historic Places and is a National Historic Civil Engineering Landmark.

Description
The highway consists of the eastern half of Utah State Route 9. After exiting the park, the highway continues east to U.S. Route 89 at Mount Carmel Junction. The road became part of a loop tour of Zion, Bryce Canyon National Park, Cedar Breaks National Monument, and the North Rim of Grand Canyon National Park.

Design and construction

The route was surveyed in 1923 by B.J. Finch, district engineer of the US Bureau of Public Roads, Howard C. Means, a Utah state engineer, and John Winder, a local rancher. The National Park Service evaluated alternative routes, including one that used Parunuweap Canyon (following the East Fork Virgin River), but settled on the Pine Creek route, which required a tunnel through the Great Arch. Detailed design work on the road was carried out by the Bureau of Public Roads. Details including bridges, retaining walls, culverts, and other features were designed by the National Park Service Branch of Plans and Design under the supervision of Thomas Chalmers Vint.

The west portal is framed by a masonry facade of cut sandstone, while the east portal is a naturalistically formed hole in the rock, entered directly from a bridge. Construction proceeded using mining techniques rather than traditional tunneling techniques, starting from a stope and working outward to the portals. The tunnel uses galleries to provide light and ventilation through the canyon wall to the outside air. The galleries also provided a place to dispose of rock generated during construction, which was dumped through the galleries into the canyon. Parking spaces were originally provided at the galleries, but were discontinued due to safety concerns. Some galleries have been repaired and partially closed with concrete due to damage from rockslides. The interior of the tunnel is rock-faced, with concrete reinforcement at selected locations.

Work on the tunnel was started in 1927 by the Nevada Construction Company and was completed in 1930 at a cost of $503,000 (equivalent to $ million in ). At the time of its completion it was the longest non-urban road tunnel in the United States.

Other significant structures include the Pine Creek and Virgin River Bridges and a second, short tunnel through a rock spur east of the main tunnel.

The Zion – Mount Carmel Highway was added to the National Register of Historic Places on July 7, 1987. The Zion Mt. Carmel Tunnel and Highway was designated as a National Historic Civil Engineering Landmark by the American Society of Civil Engineers in 2011.

See also

East Entrance Sign (Zion National Park)
Floor of the Valley Road
List of bridges documented by the Historic American Engineering Record in Utah
List of tunnels documented by the Historic American Engineering Record in Utah
National Register of Historic Places listings in Kane County, Utah
National Register of Historic Places listings in Zion National Park

References

External links

 (video of vehicle passing through Zion Tunnel)
Historic American Engineering Record (HAER) documentation, filed under Springdale, Washington County, UT:

Parkitecture in the Western Parks: Transportation Systems National Park Service

Transportation buildings and structures on the National Register of Historic Places in Utah
Historic American Engineering Record in Utah
Roads on the National Register of Historic Places in Utah
Transportation in Washington County, Utah
Tunnels completed in 1930
Tunnels in Utah
Road tunnels on the National Register of Historic Places
Road tunnels in the United States
National Register of Historic Places in Washington County, Utah
National Register of Historic Places in Kane County, Utah
National Register of Historic Places in Zion National Park
1930 establishments in Utah
National Park Service rustic in Utah
Historic Civil Engineering Landmarks